All-Russian comprehensive system information and warning the population in crowded places (OKSION) is Russia's complex systems for monitoring, reporting and alerts. It was created in the framework of the Federal Target Program "Risk reduction and mitigation of natural and man-made disasters in the Russian Federation up to 2010". In May 2011, 596 OKSION terminal facilities in 37 data centers were built and put into operation. 2590 Plasmas and 1035 devices, such as "running line" were established.
 
The whole complex is managed by "OKSION" (Federal State Institution All-Russian Information Centre), a complex system of informing and warning the population in crowded places. The Head of FSBI IC "OKSION" is Nicholas Balema.
 
The system is divided into components dealing with on-street public notification (PUON) and at points located on the premises (pions). They consist of a large plasma or LCD screens, cameras, sound-amplifying equipment, and equipment for radiation and chemical control (PRHK).

References

Emergency management in Russia
Emergency services in Russia
Science and technology in Russia
Civil defense